Shorea inappendiculata is a species of plant in the family Dipterocarpaceae. It is a tree found in Borneo. It is threatened by habitat loss.

See also
List of Shorea species

References

inappendiculata
Endemic flora of Borneo
Trees of Borneo
Critically endangered flora of Asia
Taxonomy articles created by Polbot
Taxa named by William Burck